Parantennulidae is a family of mites in the order Mesostigmata.

Species
Parantennulidae contains three genera, with four recognized species:

 Genus Parantennulus Berlese, 1904
 Parantennulus scolopendrarum (Berlese, 1886)
 Genus Diplopodophilus Willmann, 1940
 Diplopodophilus antennophoroides Willman, 1940
 Genus Micromegistus Trägårdh, 1948
 Micromegistus bakeri Trägårdh
 Micromegistus gourlayi Womersley, 1958

References

Mesostigmata
Acari families